Combinatorics is a branch of mathematics concerning the study of finite or countable discrete structures.

Essence of combinatorics 

 Matroid
 Greedoid
 Ramsey theory
 Van der Waerden's theorem
 Hales–Jewett theorem
 Umbral calculus, binomial type polynomial sequences
 Combinatorial species

Branches of combinatorics 

 Algebraic combinatorics
 Analytic combinatorics
 Arithmetic combinatorics
 Combinatorics on words 
 Combinatorial design theory 
 Enumerative combinatorics 
 Extremal combinatorics
 Geometric combinatorics 
 Graph theory
 Infinitary combinatorics 
 Matroid theory 
 Order theory 
 Partition theory 
 Probabilistic combinatorics
 Topological combinatorics

Multi-disciplinary fields that include combinatorics 

 Coding theory
 Combinatorial optimization
 Combinatorics and dynamical systems
 Combinatorics and physics
 Discrete geometry
 Finite geometry
 Phylogenetics

History of combinatorics 

History of combinatorics

General combinatorial principles and methods
 Combinatorial principles
 Trial and error, brute-force search, bogosort, British Museum algorithm
 Pigeonhole principle
 Method of distinguished element
 Mathematical induction
 Recurrence relation, telescoping series
 Generating functions as an application of formal power series
 Cyclic sieving
 Schrödinger method
 Exponential generating function
 Stanley's reciprocity theorem
 Binomial coefficients and their properties
 Combinatorial proof
 Double counting (proof technique)
 Bijective proof
 Inclusion–exclusion principle
 Möbius inversion formula
 Parity, even and odd permutations
 Combinatorial Nullstellensatz
 Incidence algebra
 Greedy algorithm
 Divide and conquer algorithm
 Akra–Bazzi method
 Dynamic programming
 Branch and bound
 Birthday attack, birthday paradox
 Floyd's cycle-finding algorithm
 Reduction to linear algebra
 Sparsity
 Weight function
 Minimax algorithm
 Alpha–beta pruning
 Probabilistic method
 Sieve methods
 Analytic combinatorics
 Symbolic combinatorics
 Combinatorial class
 Exponential formula  
 Twelvefold way  
 MacMahon Master theorem

Data structure concepts
 Data structure
 Data type
 Abstract data type
 Algebraic data type
 Composite type
 Array
 Associative array
 Deque
 List
 Linked list
 Queue
 Priority queue
 Skip list
 Stack
 Tree data structure
 Automatic garbage collection

Problem solving as an art
 Heuristic
 Inductive reasoning
 How to Solve It
 Creative problem solving
 Morphological analysis (problem-solving)

Living with large numbers
 Names of large numbers, long scale
 History of large numbers
 Graham's number
 Moser's number
 Skewes' number
 Large number notations
 Conway chained arrow notation
 Hyper4
 Knuth's up-arrow notation
 Moser polygon notation
 Steinhaus polygon notation
 Large number effects
 Exponential growth
 Combinatorial explosion
 Branching factor
 Granularity
 Curse of dimensionality
 Concentration of measure

Persons influential in the field of combinatorics 
 Noga Alon
 George Andrews
 József Beck
 Eric Temple Bell
 Claude Berge
 Béla Bollobás
 Peter Cameron
 Louis Comtet
 John Horton Conway
 On Numbers and Games
 Winning Ways for your Mathematical Plays
 Persi Diaconis
 Ada Dietz
 Paul Erdős
 Erdős conjecture
 Philippe Flajolet
 Solomon Golomb
 Ron Graham
 Ben Green
 Tim Gowers
 Jeff Kahn
 Gil Kalai
 Gyula O. H. Katona
 Daniel J. Kleitman
 Imre Leader
 László Lovász
 Fedor Petrov
 George Pólya
 Vojtěch Rödl
 Gian-Carlo Rota
 Cecil C. Rousseau
 H. J. Ryser
 Dick Schelp
 Vera T. Sós
 Joel Spencer
 Emanuel Sperner
 Richard P. Stanley
 Benny Sudakov
 Endre Szemerédi
 Terence Tao
 Carsten Thomassen
 Jacques Touchard
 Pál Turán
 Bartel Leendert van der Waerden
 Herbert Wilf
 Richard Wilson
 Doron Zeilberger

Combinatorics scholars 
:Category:Combinatorialists

Journals
 Advances in Combinatorics
 Annals of Combinatorics
 Ars Combinatoria
 Australasian Journal of Combinatorics
 Bulletin of the Institute of Combinatorics and Its Applications
 Combinatorica
 Combinatorics, Probability and Computing
 Computational Complexity
 Designs, Codes and Cryptography
 Discrete Analysis
 Discrete and Computational Geometry
 Discrete Applied Mathematics
 Discrete Mathematics
 Discrete Mathematics & Theoretical Computer Science
 Discrete Optimization
 Discussiones Mathematicae Graph Theory
 Electronic Journal of Combinatorics
 European Journal of Combinatorics
 The Fibonacci Quarterly
 Finite Fields and Their Applications
 Geombinatorics
 Graphs and Combinatorics
 Integers, Electronic Journal of Combinatorial Number Theory
 Journal of Algebraic Combinatorics
 Journal of Automata, Languages and Combinatorics
 Journal of Combinatorial Designs
 Journal of Combinatorial Mathematics and Combinatorial Computing
 Journal of Combinatorial Optimization
 Journal of Combinatorial Theory, Series A
 Journal of Combinatorial Theory, Series B
 Journal of Complexity
 Journal of Cryptology
 Journal of Graph Algorithms and Applications
 Journal of Graph Theory
 Journal of Integer Sequences (Electronic)
 Journal of Mathematical Chemistry
 Online Journal of Analytic Combinatorics
 Optimization Methods and Software
 The Ramanujan Journal
 Séminaire Lotharingien de Combinatoire
 SIAM Journal on Discrete Mathematics

Prizes 
 Euler Medal
 European Prize in Combinatorics
 Fulkerson Prize
 König Prize
 Pólya Prize

See also 

 List of factorial and binomial topics
 List of partition topics
 List of permutation topics
 List of puzzle topics.
 List of formal language and literal string topics

References

External links 

 Combinatorics, a MathWorld article with many references.
 Combinatorics, from a MathPages.com portal. 
 The Hyperbook of Combinatorics, a collection of math articles links. 
 The Two Cultures of Mathematics by W. T. Gowers, article on problem solving vs theory building 

Combinatorics
Combinatorics
+
combinatorics